She and the Three is a 1922 German silent comedy film directed by E. A. Dupont and starring Henny Porten, Hermann Thimig, and Robert Scholz.

The film's sets were designed by the art director Ludwig Kainer.

Plot
Lia Lona is a celebrated film diva. One day, when she is presented with a certificate by a film club that bears her name in her honour, she considers the man who wants to give her a diploma to be a thief. Then things start to get turbulent. In the moving train, she pulls the emergency brake on the run and is then arrested. The accusation, which is a total nonsense, brings her to court where the judge assigns Lia has to start five days of arrest for her hasty action. But for the film diva, the punishment becomes an amusing and lively change from everyday acting. Cleverly, she can also instruct her film crew to use these "holidays from the self" to produce semi-documentary footage, which she plans to weave into her next film.

Cast

References

External links

Films of the Weimar Republic
German silent feature films
Films directed by E. A. Dupont
Films about filmmaking
UFA GmbH films
German comedy films
1922 comedy films
German black-and-white films
Silent comedy films
1920s German films